(stylized as Str.A.In.: Strategic Armored Infantry) is a mecha anime series by Happinet and Studio Fantasia. It premiered across Japan on WOWOW from November 1, 2006. A manga adaptation is being serialized in the Dragon Age magazine. The concept of the series is loosely based upon Frances Hodgson Burnett's novels, most notably A Little Princess (1905), but also Little Lord Fauntleroy (1886) and The Secret Garden (1911). The series also draws some elements from the Gundam franchise. In 2008, Texas-based licensor FUNimation Entertainment acquired the license of Strain: Strategic Armored Infantry. The anime was available in a complete DVD release on January 27, 2009 across North America.

Synopsis

In the distant future (c. 6000 AD), Humans have spread across the Galaxy and have split into two factions; the Galactic Union and the Deague, which are currently at war. To allow for practical interstellar travel, both factions have developed sub-lightspeed drives, which allow ships to travel huge distances in a greatly reduced subjective time (due to Time Dilation).

The Union's strongest force is made up of mecha called Strains, short for Strategic Armored Infantry, operated by pilots called "Reasoners". In order to become a Reasoner, a potential pilot must have a Mimic, a machine fused with brain cells taken from the Reasoner before birth - thus, if the Mimic is damaged or destroyed, it cannot be replaced. The Deague do not possess Strain technology, but instead utilize swarms of small automated attack fighters called Tumors.

Sara Werec, an orphan, is the focus of the story. In Episode 1, she despairs that her older brother Ralph, who is considered the best Reasoner in the Galactic Union, has been assigned a mission that will take him 130 lightyears away to the front lines; due to time dilation, even if he does survive, Sara will have died of old age long before he could ever return home. She decides that when she grows up, she will become a Reasoner herself and join the war in order to see her brother again.

Sara grows up to be the star Reasoner of her Academy. One day, the Academy's planet is suddenly attacked by the Deague. The enemy force is headed by a powerful Strain, whom Sara attempts to engage. The pilot takes out Sara, destroying her Strain and Mimic, then obliterates the Academy and kills all of her friends. Sara escapes from her Strain alive and follows the enemy pilot into a forgotten lab near the Academy. The pilot retrieves a little girl in stasis, and Sara recognizes the pilot as her brother Ralph. She calls out to him, but he barely seems to recognize his sister as he returns to his Strain and leaves. She then resolves to find out the truth of what caused her brother's betrayal.

With her Mimic destroyed, Sara can no longer pilot a Strain, so she devotes herself to training as a "Gambee" pilot (a smaller, less maneuverable mecha) under the pseudonym "Sara Cruz". She seems to suffer from post traumatic stress disorder throughout most of the series from this point on. She becomes very quiet, allows people to bully her, responds only with stares to insults, and seems very uncomfortable around others. She is repeatedly haunted by memories of her brother, and of her dead friends. Part of her antisocial behavior seems to be a fear of losing any more people, as she did in the first episode.

At first, Sara is rejected by the other pilots. Because she no longer has a Mimic, she cannot pilot a Strain, so she is forced to join the Gambee unit. Because of her antisocial behavior, obsessive training, and talent that seems to come from nowhere, she is disliked and bullied by the other Gambee pilots. Everyone seems attracted to her both for the mystery of who she is and for their jealousy towards her.

Eventually, Sara is taken under the wing of a very talented and headstrong Reasoner named Lottie, despite the fact that Sara is not (or, to be more precise, no longer) a Reasoner. Being rejected and not quite feeling like she fits in with anyone, she spends much of her time in a storeroom filled with junk. It is in here that she finds a doll that she calls Emily. This doll, being human-like, seems to be a safe thing for her to connect with and she spends a lot of time talking to it and taking care of it (which, in turn makes her even stranger and more disliked by her crewmates).

In the same storeroom, Sara later meets childlike pilots Melchi and Carmichael, who are rebuilding a ruined Strain called Ram-Dass. Sara discovers that Melchi found a Mimic and created the Emily doll around it. When the two are ready to test the Strain, they use Emily as the Mimic and Sara as the pilot. Somehow, she is able to connect with the Strain despite the fact that it isn't "her" Mimic. Despite some initial resistance from command, she is allowed to be a Strain pilot for the army. This causes even more resentment from the other Gambee pilots, since being a Strain pilot is seen as more prestigious and it feels to them as though she cheated to get it; and also because her abilities piloting a Strain could have saved lives.

In later episodes, it is discovered that the little girl whom Ralph had taken is named Emily as well. Towards the end of the series, it is revealed that this Emily is a member of an alien race that lived 600 years ago. The race consisted of pale-skinned identical girls, all of whom shared a telepathic connection to one another. When this race was discovered by the Union, the girls were imprisoned and most were dissected to study their telepathic connection. The aliens attempted to send a rescue operation to save those of them that had been captured for research. Initially successful, some of the research survived and the Union developed Strains. Due to the time-dilation effect of sub-lightspeed travel, the Union was able to send their best and brightest Strain pilots, including Ralph, to combat the aliens. Unbeknownst to the Union pilots what had happened in the past, Ralph, after he defeats the last of the alien attacks, watches one of the pilots die in his arms, while telling him the truth about her race's fate. The collective memories of her race's mistreatment and suffering at the hands of the Union scientists is then psychically forced into Ralph's mind, causing him to a develop an uncontrollable and seemingly psychopathic determination and rage to retrieve the last Emilys, and to annihilate any humans that stand in his way. The alien's last action is to send Ralph through time to accomplish this mission.

Some, like Ralph's Emily, were put into stasis and were long-forgotten. Convinced by Ralph that the girls are valuable technological windfalls, a Deague ship, under the command of Captain Vivian Medlock, begins a campaign to acquire all of the dead and living samples of the Emilys. It is for this reason that Ralph and the Deague later chases Sara's crew and ship, because the Emily Mimic that Sara found contains the mind of one of two surviving Emilys (the other being the Emily which Ralph rescued in the first episode).

Although Ralph is seemingly allied with the Deague (and is thus considered a traitor by the Union), it later becomes clear that he is only using the Deague (and his romance with Captain Medlock) to achieve his goal, and will not hesitated to kill them should they stand in his way.

The manga serialized in Dragon Age Magazine focuses on Lottie's background, stopping once Sara joins the team.

Characters

Almost every character has been adapted from a Hodgson Burnett character. Though the first names of many characters are retained from A Little Princess and the other novels, the last names are scrambled, such as Crewe=Werec, or otherwise altered, such as St. John=Johannitz.

She begins a happy, well-liked and bright girl, the star graduate student of the elite Grabera Spatial Armoured Infantry Research Institute. Her parents, James and Annie Werec, are dead and she clings to the notion of seeing her beloved brother again. However, when her friends, her teachers and her Mimic are destroyed by none other than Ralph himself, she becomes a brooding, blunt, taciturn girl reduced to piloting unremarkable Gambee units.

She appears to suffer from post-traumatic stress disorder. Despite her defeat and disgrace instigated by her traitorous brother (which she escapes by cutting her hair, renaming herself Sara Cruz and transferring to another academy) and the bullying she endures from the bitter and confused Gambee pilots, Sara is completely focused on learning the truth. Her most precious possession is a musical pendant given to her by Ralph, until it is stolen (presumably by the jealous Isabella) in episode 2, after which she finds her Emily. Soon afterwards, Sara discovers that, against all expectations, Emily allows her to pilot a Strain again and she takes control of the Ink Strain Ram-Dass. She considers Emily to be her last hope to find out the truth and hopes that Ralph will revert to the kind and loving brother he once was.

Sara's name comes from the novel's Sara Crewe.

Ralph was a dutiful soldier, the star student of Grabera Academy and the youngest person ever to pilot a Gloire Strain. Sara last saw him promising on his parents' grave not to let the family down. Six years later, he reappears in disguise with a scar on his face, having done just that and joined the Deague. He even coldly destroys Sara's home, friends and Mimic. Sara is driven by the mystery of why he has done so, and promises to face him again. Ralph's true motivation is partially out of compassion and partially from insanity.

Ralph Crewe in the novel was Sara's father, who died and his fortune disappeared; this led to Sara Crewe's ruin, as this Ralph's defection did to Sara Werec.

Episode list
The gaps in the air dates are attributed to two two-week hiatuses for a tennis tournament in late December–January, and the early premiere of Rocket Girls.
{| class="wikitable" width="98%"
|-
! No. !! Title !! Directed by !! Written by !! Original air date
|-
| colspan="5" bgcolor="#CCF" |
|-

|}

Theme songs
Opening
"Message" performed by Yoko

Ending
"Umi no Opal" performed by Sema (episodes 1-8, 10-13)
"Aurora ~a ray of dawn~" performed by Yoko (episode 9)

References

External links

  
  
 

Anime with original screenplays
Fujimi Shobo manga
Mecha anime and manga
Funimation
Studio Fantasia
Japanese LGBT-related animated television series
Shōnen manga
Wowow original programming